Prem Nath (1 July 1951 – 2 June 2015) was an Indian freestyle wrestler. He won a gold medal at the 1974 Commonwealth Wrestling Championship in Christchurch. He is a President's Medal-winning retired Delhi Police official and was known for his efforts to popularise wrestling in Delhi.

Personal life
Prem Nath was trained by coach Guru Hanuman. He is survived by his wife, two sons and a daughter.

Career 
 1976 He took over an akhara (established by Guru Baijnath in 1948) in the Kamla Nagar area, and ran it for a long time before handing it over to his son Vikram Kumar Sonkar, a current India coach, in 2004. It is now known as the Guru Prem Nath Akhara.
 1974, He won a gold medal in the 57 kg category at the 1974 British Commonwealth Games in New Zealand.
 1972, He was given the Arjuna Award by the President of India in 1972.
 He showed a great performance in 1972 summer olympics and finished in fourth place in the freestyle bantamweight category.

References

External links 
 
 Wrestling at the 1972 Summer Olympics
 List of Arjun Award Winner
 Arjuna Awards - Sports Authority Of India - pdf

1955 births
2015 deaths
Indian male sport wrestlers
Olympic wrestlers of India
Wrestlers at the 1972 Summer Olympics
Commonwealth Games medallists in wrestling
Commonwealth Games gold medallists for India
Wrestlers at the 1974 British Commonwealth Games
Indian male professional wrestlers
Medallists at the 1974 British Commonwealth Games